= Pactos =

Pactos (Persian: شرکت دانش‌بنیان پکتوس lit. Pactos Knowledge Enterprise) is an Iranian software company based in Tehran. Pactos was founded in 1992 by four graduates of SUT (Sharif University of Technology) in Tehran. They offer packaged computer software in Persian. They compile, sell, and support packaged programs for end users in the consumer sector, and also sell packages to the governmental sector. Also Pactos is a manufacturer of hardware for blind people in Iran.
